Fair Finance Watch is a US-based non-governmental organization which investigates the banking industry's treatment of low-income communities around the world. It produces weekly reports on global banks like HSBC, Citigroup, Royal Bank of Scotland, Mizuho Financial Group and others. It was founded by lawyer Matthew Lee.

History
In 1998, Fair Finance Watch and its predecessors took the lead in opposing the merger of Citicorp and Travelers to form Citigroup.  Founder Matthew Lee spoke at both companies' shareholders' meetings, commented to the Federal Reserve Board, and later initiated litigation against the merger, the largest in the financial services industry.  Since then, Fair Finance Watch has pursued Citigroup as it has made acquisitions in Mexico and elsewhere, while initiating similar campaigns regarding HSBC, JPMorgan Chase, Bank of America, Wachovia, Deutsche Bank, Royal Bank of Scotland, American International Group, Wells Fargo and others.

In 2000, Lee's investigation of the merger of US Bank and Firstar for his Inner City Press triggered a Federal Reserve Board inquiry into the banks' practices.

In October 2012, Fair Finance Watch raised fair lending and compliance issues about M&T Bank's application to acquire Hudson City Bancorp, which remains unapproved as of June 2013.

In the Spring of 2013, in the US, Fair Finance Watch raised fair lending issues regarding Investors Bank.

References

External links
 

Oversight and watchdog organizations
Ethical banking